Laura Valpuri Lindstedt (born 1 May 1976 in Kajaani) is a Finnish novelist. Her debut novel, Scissors, which was published in 2007, was nominated for the Finlandia Prize, the top literary prize in Finland. Lindstedt's second novel, Oneiron, which took 8 years to write, earned her the Finlandia Prize in 2015. Lindstedt is one of Finland's leading internationally known writers.

References

1976 births
Living people
21st-century Finnish novelists
Finnish women novelists
People from Kajaani